1-Phosphatidylinositol-4,5-bisphosphate phosphodiesterase delta-3 is an enzyme that in humans is encoded by the PLCD3 gene.

Function 

This gene encodes a member of the phospholipase C family, which catalyze the hydrolysis of phosphatidylinositol 4,5-bisphosphate to generate the second messengers diacylglycerol and inositol 1,4,5-trisphosphate (IP3). Diacylglycerol and IP3 mediate a variety of cellular responses to extracellular stimuli by inducing protein kinase C and increasing cytosolic Ca2+ concentrations. This enzyme localizes to the plasma membrane and requires calcium for activation. Its activity is inhibited by spermine, sphingosine, and several phospholipids.

References

Further reading 

 
 
 
 
 
 
 
 
 
 
 
 
 
 

EC 3.1.4